Jay Aspin (born August 19, 1949) is a Canadian politician who served as the Member of Parliament for the riding of Nipissing—Timiskaming from 2011 to 2015.

Aspin was elected to the House of Commons of Canada for the Conservative Party of Canada in the 2011 election. He finished just 14 votes ahead of Liberal incumbent Anthony Rota in the initial count, triggering an automatic judicial recount which ultimately confirmed his victory by a margin of just 18 votes.

Prior to his election, Aspin had served as a city councillor for North Bay City Council, as well as a trustee for the Near North District School Board and its predecessor, the Nipissing Board of Education. He also worked as a business consultant and for the Ontario Northland Transportation Commission.

Aspin was defeated in the 2015 federal election by Anthony Rota, whom Aspin previously defeated in 2011. Aspin lost by approximately 11,000 votes, garnering 14,000 votes in total.

In the 2018 North Bay Municipal Election, Aspin stood as a candidate for one of the four public school trustee positions in North Bay for the Near North District School Board. Aspin finished first among eight candidates and was elected to the board for the 2018–2022 term.

References

External links

1949 births
Anglophone Quebec people
Conservative Party of Canada MPs
Living people
Members of the House of Commons of Canada from Ontario
North Bay, Ontario city councillors
People from Westmount, Quebec
Ontario school board trustees
21st-century Canadian politicians